Andrés Artuñedo and David Pérez Sanz were the defending champions but only Artuñedo chose to defend his title, partnering Sergio Martos Gornés. Artuñedo lost in the first round to Andreas Siljeström and Andrea Vavassori.

Sander Arends and David Pel won the title after defeating Orlando Luz and Felipe Meligeni Alves 6–4, 7–6(7–3) in the final.

Seeds

Draw

References

External links
 Main draw

Open Castilla y León - Men's Doubles
2019 Men's Doubles
2019 Open Castilla y León